Kathryn Moon ( Nageotte; born June 13, 1991) is an American athlete, specializing in pole vaulting. She won gold medals at the 2020 Tokyo Olympics and 2022 World Athletics Championships, and a silver at the 2022 World Indoor Championships. Nageotte signed a sponsorship deal with Nike in 2018.

Early athletic career
Nageotte's career started at Ashland University where she won two NCAA Division II national championships.

Achievements

International competitions

National championships

NCAA championships
Katie Nageotte is a two-time NCAA Division II Pole Vault champion and three-time All-American.

Prep
Katie Nageotte graduated from Olmsted Falls HS with a state record  in the pole vault. She was also the 2008 Division 1 state runner and the 2009 Division 1 state champion.
Nageotte was a diver at Olmsted Falls High School and was a level 4 Gymnast through the age of 9 years.

References

External links
 
 
 Katie Nageotte University of Dayton Track and Field Results
 2011 NCAA descending order list
 
 Katie Nageotte Olmsted Falls HS Bulldogs Track and Field Results
 
 
 

1991 births
Living people
American female pole vaulters
World Athletics Championships athletes for the United States
People from Olmsted Falls, Ohio
Sportspeople from Cuyahoga County, Ohio
Ashland University alumni
Track and field athletes from Ohio
Athletes (track and field) at the 2019 Pan American Games
Pan American Games silver medalists for the United States
Pan American Games medalists in athletics (track and field)
Pan American Games track and field athletes for the United States
USA Indoor Track and Field Championships winners
Medalists at the 2019 Pan American Games
USA Outdoor Track and Field Championships winners
Athletes (track and field) at the 2020 Summer Olympics
Medalists at the 2020 Summer Olympics
Olympic gold medalists for the United States in track and field
21st-century American women
World Athletics Indoor Championships medalists
20th-century American women